María Carolina Cuevas Merino (born 26 February 1966) is a Chilean politician.

She was a founding member of Renovación Nacional.

On 11 March 2018, Cuevas Merino was appointed during the second government of Sebastián Piñera (2018–2022) as Undersecretary for Women and Gender Equity. Likewise, from 13 March to 6 May, she temporarily held the position of Minister of Women and Gender Equity, position she left when Piñera appointed Macarena Santelices, former major of Olmué. Then, Cuevas Merino left the position of Undersecretary of Women once she was appointed as the president of the National Council of Television (CNTV) in January 2021.

References

External links
 Profile at CNTV

1966 births
Living people
Chilean people
University of Chile alumni
Adolfo Ibáñez University alumni
National Renewal (Chile) politicians
21st-century Chilean politicians
Ministers of Women and Gender Equality of Chile
Women government ministers of Chile